Çelov (also, Chalov and Çalov) is a village and municipality in the Gobustan Rayon of Azerbaijan.  It has a population of 1,310.

References 

Populated places in Gobustan District